Atalanta B.C. returned to Serie A following a two-year absence, and immediately established itself on the top half of the table, finishing in 7th place. Coach Giovanni Vavassori was hailed as the main contributor to the success, having come from the youth side a couple of years before, first promoting the club, and then having such a successful inaugural Serie A campaign. Inter-owned Nicola Ventola scored ten league goals, enough to persuade Inter to take him back, and playmaker Cristiano Doni got his proper breakthrough as well. Experienced Massimo Carrera held the defence together, and was also widely praised, while goalkeeper Ivan Pelizzoli was signed by champions Roma.

Players

First-team squad

Transfers

In

Out

Competitions

Overview

Serie A

Results by round

Matches

Coppa Italia

Group stage

Knockout stage

Round of 32

Round of 16

Quarter-finals

Statistics

Appearances and goals

|-
! colspan=10 style=background:#DCDCDC; text-align:center| Players transferred out during the season

Goalscorers

Notes

References

Atalanta B.C. seasons
Atalanta